The Greeks in Sweden constitute people of Greek nationality who have settled in Sweden, as well as Swedish people and Swedish residents of Greek heritage.

, there were 19,547 people born in Greece living in Sweden, as well as 14,807 people born in Sweden with at least one parent born in Greece. They are located mostly in the southern part of Sweden, especially around Stockholm.

Notable people

Steve Angello - DJ, producer, and music label owner
Mikkey Dee - drummer and songwriter for Motörhead
Theodor Kallifatides - writer
Kim Cesarion - singer
Elena Paparizou - singer
Apollo Papathanasio - singer
Alexandra Pascalidou - journalist, TV host, and author
Vasilis Papageorgiou - author, translator, university professor
Babis Stefanidis - football player and manager
Panajotis Dimitriadis - football player
Elli Avram - Bollywood Actress
Sotirios Papagiannopoulos - football player
Sotiris Delis - politician, Member of the Riksdag since 2014
Dimitri Stassos - songwriter, particularly for the Eurovision Song Contest
Nino (Greek singer) - half Swedish male singer from Swedish mother and Greek father 
Antique (band) Swedish band, member born and raised in Sweden Nikos Panagiotidis - singer and musician (bouzouki)
Alex P - Greek Swedish songwriter and music producer

See also 
Greece–Sweden relations
Greek diaspora

References

Further reading

External links
Greek embassy in Stockholm

Sweden
 
Greeks